Pettawee Sor.Kittichai is a Thai Muay Thai fighter.

Biography and career
Pettawee was introduced to Muay Thai training by his uncle at the a of 5 years old along his brothers. After a few months of training he had his first fights for the Sor Kittichai camp in Thung Song. During his stadium career he defeated notable champions such as Sam-A Gaiyanghadao, Singtongnoi Por.Telakun, Pakorn Sakyothin or Wuttidet Lukprabat. He also captured the Thailand title at 122 lbs.

On December 24, 2012, Pettawee faced Saeksan Or. Kwanmuang at the Rajadamnern Stadium Anniversary show. The fight was judged a draw.

In April 2013 Pettawee was scheduled to face Thanonchai Topr.Sangtiennoi. He lost the fight by knockout in the third round.

On July 16, 2013, Pettawee faced Pokaew Fonjangchonburi at Lumpinee Stadium. He won the fight by decision.

In 2015 Pettawee moved to New Zealand where he worked as a trainer and kept competing on the local scene. In February 2015, 2017 Pettawee defeated Joey Baylon by unanimous decision.

Pettawee was scheduled to face Zhu Xu at EM-Legend 33 on August 31, 2018, for the WKA World K-1 lightweight title. He won the fight by unanimous decision to capture the title.

Pettawee returned to Thailand in 2020 as a coach at the Sitsongpeenong and Sinbi Muay Thai camps in Phuket. He was scheduled to face Phonek Or Kwanmuang at The Champion Muaythai for his first fight in Thailand in 6 years. He lost the fight by decision.

On April 11, 2021, Pettawee faced Sherzod Kabutov at Muay Thai Super Champ. He lost the fight by decision.

Titles and accomplishments
Professional Boxing Association of Thailand (PAT) 
 2005 Thailand 122 lbs Champion
Onesongchai
 2007 S1 World 122 lbs Champion
World Kick Boxing Federation
 2019 WKBF World Muay Thai -62 kg Champion
World Kickboxing Association
 2018 WKA K-1 World Lightweight Champion

Fight record

|-  style="background:#fbb;"
| 2021-04-11|| Loss ||align=left| Sherzod Kabutov || Muay Thai Super Champ || Bangkok, Thailand || Decision || 3 || 3:00

|-  style="background:#cfc;"
| 2020-11-29|| Win ||align=left| Luca Lassalle || Muay Thai Super Champ || Bangkok, Thailand || Decision || 3 || 3:00

|-  style="background:#fbb;"
| 2020-09-26|| Loss ||align=left| Phonek Or.Kwanmuang || The Champion Muaythai || Pattaya, Thailand || Decision || 3 || 3:00

|-  style="background:#cfc;"
| 2019-11-16|| Win ||align=left| Nikora Lee-Kingi|| Capital Punishment 50 || Porirua, New Zealand || Decision (Unanimous) || 5 || 3:00
|-
! style=background:white colspan=9 | 

|-  style="background:#cfc;"
| 2018-12-15|| Win ||align=left| Nikora Lee-Kingi||  Born To Fight 4 || Auckland, New Zealand || Decision (Unanimous) || 3 || 3:00

|-  style="background:#cfc;"
| 2018-08-31|| Win ||align=left| Zhu Xu || EM Legend 33 || Auckland, New Zealand || Decision (Unanimous)|| 5 || 3:00 
|-
! style=background:white colspan=9 | 

|-  style="background:#cfc;"
| 2018-07-21|| Win ||align=left| Dominic Reed|| Capital Punbishment 43 || Porirua, New Zealand || Decision (Unanimous) || 5 || 3:00

|-  style="background:#cfc;"
| 2018-06-08|| Win ||align=left| Dominic Reed|| King in the Ring 75 || Porirua, New Zealand || Decision (Unanimous) || 3 || 3:00

|-  style="background:#cfc;"
| 2018-02-17|| Win ||align=left| Kayne Conlan||  Capital Punishment 41 || Porirua, New Zealand || Decision (Split) || 5 || 3:00

|-  style="background:#cfc;"
| 2017-11-18|| Win ||align=left| Nikora Lee-Kingi|| Capital Punishment 40 || Porirua, New Zealand || TKO || 1 ||

|-  style="background:#cfc;"
| 2017-10-21|| Win ||align=left| Mike || Fanta Promotion Thai Boxing F1 || Auckland, New Zealand ||||  ||  
|-
! style=background:white colspan=9 | 

|-  style="background:#cfc;"
| 2017-02-25|| Win ||align=left| Joey Baylon|| Capital Punishment 37 || Porirua, New Zealand || Decision (Unanimous)|| 5 || 3:00

|-  style="background:#cfc;"
| 2016-05-21|| Win ||align=left| Ricky Campbell|| Capital Punishment 34 || Wellington, New Zealand || Decision (Unanimous)|| 5 || 3:00

|-  style="background:#cfc;"
| 2016-02-27|| Win ||align=left| Chris Wells|| Capital Punishment 33 || Porirua, New Zealand || Decision (Unanimous)|| 5 || 3:00

|-  style="background:#fbb;"
| 2014-11-10|| Loss ||align=left| Songkom Skahomsin || Onesongchai, Rajadamnern Stadium || Bangkok, Thailand || Decision || 5 || 3:00

|-  style="background:#fbb;"
| 2014-10-08|| Loss ||align=left| Songkom Skahomsin || Onesongchai, Rajadamnern Stadium || Bangkok, Thailand || Decision || 5 || 3:00

|-  style="background:#fbb;"
| 2014-08-14|| Loss ||align=left| Superbank Mor Ratanabandit || Rajadamnern Stadium || Bangkok, Thailand || Decision || 5 || 3:00

|-  style="background:#fbb;"
| 2014-07-16|| Loss ||align=left| Superbank Mor Ratanabandit || Tor.Chaiwat, Rajadamnern Stadium || Bangkok, Thailand || Decision || 5 || 3:00

|-  style="background:#cfc;"
| 2014-06-11|| Win ||align=left| Sam-A Gaiyanghadao || Phetwiset + Wanmeechai, Rajadamnern Stadium || Bangkok, Thailand || KO (Head kick) || 3 ||

|-  style="background:#cfc;"
| 2014-03-30|| Win ||align=left| Rungphet Wor Rungniran||  || Songkhla province, Thailand || Decision || 5 || 3:00

|-  style="background:#fbb;"
| 2014-02-28 || Loss ||align=left| Kaimukkao Por.Thairongruangkamai || Lumpinee Champion Krikkrai, Lumpinee Stadium || Bangkok, Thailand || Decision || 5 || 3:00

|-  style="background:#cfc;"
| 2014-01-07 || Win ||align=left| Kaewkanglek Gaiyanghadao || Petchpiya, Lumpinee Stadium || Bangkok, Thailand || Decision || 5 || 3:00

|-  style="background:#cfc;"
| 2013-09-28 || Win ||align=left| Brandon Vieira || Thai Tournament 6 || Lancy, Switzerland || Decision || 5 || 3:00

|-  style="background:#fbb;"
| 2013-09-11|| Loss ||align=left| Thanonchai Thanakorngym || Sor.Sommai, Lumpinee Stadium || Bangkok, Thailand || Decision || 5 || 3:00

|-  style="background:#cfc;"
| 2013-07-16 || Win||align=left| Pokaew Fonjangchonburi || Lumpinee Stadium || Bangkok, Thailand || Decision || 5 || 3:00

|-  style="background:#c5d2ea;"
| 2013-06-03|| Draw ||align=left| Thanonchai Thanakorngym || Onesongchai, Rajadamnern Stadium || Bangkok, Thailand || Decision || 5 || 3:00

|-  style="background:#fbb;"
| 2013-04-05|| Loss ||align=left| Thanonchai Thanakorngym || Kiatpetch, Lumpinee Stadium || Bangkok, Thailand || KO (Punch) || 3 ||

|-  style="background:#c5d2ea"
| 2012-12-24|| Draw||align=left|  Saeksan Or. Kwanmuang || Rajadamnern Stadium Anniversary Show|| Bangkok, Thailand || Decision || 5 || 3:00

|-  style="text-align:center; background:#cfc;"
| 2012-11-30 || Win ||align=left| Yodtongthai Por.Telakun || Khunsuk Trakoonyang, Lumpinee Stadium || Bangkok, Thailand || Decision || 5 || 3:00

|-  style="text-align:center; background:#cfc;"
| 2012-11-09 || Win ||align=left| Yodtongthai Por.Telakun || Phetsuphapan, Lumpinee Stadium || Bangkok, Thailand || Decision || 5 || 3:00

|-  style="background:#cfc;"
| 2012-09-12|| Win ||align=left| Nongbeer Choknamwong || Tor.Chaiwat, Rajadamnern Stadium || Bangkok, Thailand || KO (Punches) || 5 ||

|-  style="background:#fbb;"
| 2012-07-25|| Loss ||align=left| Yokmorakot Petchsimuen || Onesongchai|| Thailand || Decision || 5 || 3:00

|-  style="background:#fbb;"
| 2012-03-30|| Loss ||align=left| Kongsak Sitboonmee || Yala || Thailand || KO || 3 ||

|-  style="background:#fbb;"
| 2012-02-28 || Loss ||align=left| Yodwicha Por Boonsit || Phetsupaphan, Lumpinee Stadium || Bangkok, Thailand || Decision || 5 || 3:00
|-
! style=background:white colspan=9 | 

|-  style="background:#fbb;"
| 2012-01-26 || Loss ||align=left| Phetek Kiatyongyut|| Onseongchai, Rajadamnern Stadium || Bangkok, Thailand || Decision || 5 || 3:00

|-  style="background:#cfc;"
| 2011-12-22 || Win ||align=left| Phetek Kiatyongyut|| Rajadamnern Stadium Anniversary Show || Bangkok, Thailand || Decision || 5 || 3:00

|-  style="background:#fbb;"
| 2011-08-18 || Loss ||align=left| Phetek Kiatyongyut|| Onseongchai, Rajadamnern Stadium || Bangkok, Thailand || Decision || 5 || 3:00

|-  style="background:#cfc;"
| 2011-05-06 || Win ||align=left| Nopakrit Naplatraihoimuk || Khunsuk Trakunhyang Lumpinee Stadium || Bangkok, Thailand || Decision || 5 || 3:00

|-  style="background:#cfc;"
| 2011-03-15 || Win ||align=left| Saenkeng Jor.Nopparat || Phetsupaphan, Lumpinee Stadium || Bangkok, Thailand || Decision || 5 || 3:00

|-  style="background:#fbb;"
| 2011-02-21|| Loss ||align=left| Noppakrit Numplatrahoimuk || Onesongchai, Rajadamnern Stadium || Bangkok, Thailand || Decision || 5 || 3:00

|-  style="background:#cfc;"
| 2011-01-18 || Win ||align=left| Phetto Sitjaopho || Por.Pramuk Rajadamnern Stadium || Bangkok, Thailand || Decision || 5 || 3:00

|-  style="background:#fbb;"
| 2010-11-02|| Loss||align=left| Kongsak Sitboonmee|| Lumpinee Stadium || Bangkok, Thailand || TKO (Ref stoppage/elbows)|| 3 || 3:00

|-  style="background:#cfc;"
| 2010-09-03 || Win ||align=left| Fahmai Skindewgym || Lumpinee Champion Krikkrai, Lumpinee Stadium || Bangkok, Thailand || Decision || 5 || 3:00

|-  style="background:#cfc;"
| 2010-08-10 || Win ||align=left| Wuttidet Lukprabat || Petchpiya + Jor.Por.Ror.7, Lumpinee Stadium || Bangkok, Thailand || Decision || 5 || 3:00

|-  style="background:#fbb;"
| 2010-06-10|| Loss ||align=left| Rungruanglek Lukprabat || Onesongchai, Rajadamnern Stadium || Bangkok, Thailand || Decision || 5 || 3:00

|-  style="background:#c5d2ea;"
| 2010-05-07|| Draw ||align=left| Rungruanglek Lukprabat || Petchpiya, Lumpinee Stadium || Bangkok, Thailand || Decision || 5 || 3:00

|-  style="background:#fbb;"
| 2010-03-05 || Loss ||align=left| Sam-A Gaiyanghadao || Lumpinee Champion Krikkrai, Lumpinee Stadium || Bangkok, Thailand || Decision || 5 || 3:00

|-  style="background:#cfc;"
| 2010-02-11 || Win||align=left| Phetek Kiatyongyut || Phettongkam, Rajadamnern Stadium || Bangkok, Thailand || Decision || 5 || 3:00

|-  style="background:#fbb;"
| 2009-12-21 || Loss||align=left| Pakorn Sakyothin || Daorungchujaroen, Rajadamnern Stadium || Bangkok, Thailand || Decision || 5 || 3:00

|-  style="background:#cfc;"
| 2009-11-26 || Win||align=left| Singtongnoi Por.Telakun || Onesongchai, Rajadamnern Stadium || Bangkok, Thailand || Decision || 5 || 3:00

|-  style="background:#cfc;"
| 2009-10-08 || Win||align=left| Pakorn Sakyothin || Rajadamnern Stadium || Bangkok, Thailand || KO (Elbow) || 3 ||

|-  style="background:#c5d2ea;"
| 2009-09-10 || Draw||align=left| Manasak Sitniwat || Phettongkam, Rajadamnern Stadium || Bangkok, Thailand || Decision || 5 || 3:00

|-  style="background:#cfc;"
| 2009-08-06 || Win ||align=left| Sam-A Gaiyanghadao || Rajadamnern Stadium || Bangkok, Thailand || Decision || 5 || 3:00

|-  style="background:#fbb;"
| 2009-07-03|| Loss||align=left| Mongkolchai Kwaitonggym|| Lumpinee vs Rajadamnern, Lumpinee Stadium  || Bangkok, Thailand || Decision || 5 || 3:00

|-  style="background:#cfc;"
| 2009-06-08 || Win ||align=left| Kaimukdam Sit-O || Onesongchai, Rajadamnern Stadium || Bangkok, Thailand || Decision || 5 || 3:00

|-  style="background:#fbb;"
| 2009-05-07 || Loss ||align=left| Pakorn Sakyothin || Onesongchai, Rajadamnern Stadium || Bangkok, Thailand || Decision || 5 || 3:00

|-  style="background:#c5d2ea;"
| 2009-03-26 || Draw||align=left| Pakorn Sakyothin || Sor.Wanchart, Rajadamnern Stadium || Bangkok, Thailand || Decision || 5 || 3:00

|-  style="background:#cfc;"
| 2009-03-06 || Win ||align=left| Singtongnoi Por.Telakun || Onesongchai || Maha Sarakham Province, Thailand || Decision || 5 || 3:00

|-  style="background:#fbb;"
| 2009-01-14 || Loss ||align=left| Singtongnoi Por.Telakun || Onesongchai, Rajadamnern Stadium || Bangkok, Thailand || Decision || 5 || 3:00

|-  style="background:#cfc;"
| 2008-12-18 || Win ||align=left| Phetto Sitjaopho || Onesongchai, Rajadamnern Stadium || Bangkok, Thailand || Decision || 5 || 3:00

|-  style="background:#cfc;"
| 2008-11-06 || Win ||align=left| Noppakrit Namplatrahoimuk || Onesongchai, Rajadamnern Stadium || Bangkok, Thailand || Decision || 5 || 3:00

|-  style="background:#cfc;"
| 2008-10-08 || Win ||align=left| Tong Lukmakhamwan || Jaomuangchon, Rajadamnern Stadium || Bangkok, Thailand || Decision || 5 || 3:00

|-  style="background:#c5d2ea;"
| 2008-08-28 || Draw||align=left| Phetek Sitjaopho || Wanthongchai, Rajadamnern Stadium || Bangkok, Thailand || Decision || 5 || 3:00

|-  style="background:#cfc;"
| 2008-07-21 || Win ||align=left| Detsuriya Sitthiprasert || Phettongkam, Rajadamnern Stadium || Bangkok, Thailand || Decision || 5 || 3:00

|-  style="background:#fbb;"
| 2008-03-26 || Loss ||align=left| Phetto Sitjaopho || Bangrachan, Rajadamnern Stadium || Bangkok, Thailand || Decision || 5 || 3:00

|-  style="background:#cfc;"
| 2008-02-07 || Win ||align=left| Chatchainoi Sitbenjama || Wanthongchai, Rajadamnern Stadium || Bangkok, Thailand || Decision || 5 || 3:00

|-  style="background:#cfc;"
| 2007-11-24 || Win ||align=left| Dejsuriya Sitthiprasert|| Onesongchai || Thonburi, Thailand || Decision || 5 || 3:00 
|-
! style=background:white colspan=9 | 

|-  style="background:#fbb;"
| 2007-10-04 || Loss ||align=left| Petchsanugen Sitniwat || Onesongchai, Rajadamnern Stadium || Bangkok, Thailand || Decision || 5 || 3:00

|-  style="background:#cfc;"
| 2008-08-30 || Win ||align=left| Phaendin Sor.Damrongrit|| Onesongchai, Rajadamnern Stadium || Bangkok, Thailand || Decision || 5 || 3:00

|-  style="background:#cfc;"
| 2007-07-16 || Win ||align=left| Singtongnoi Por.Telakun || Onesongchai, Rajadamnern Stadium || Bangkok, Thailand || Decision || 5 || 3:00

|-  style="background:#cfc;"
| 2007-06-25 || Win ||align=left| Singtongnoi Por.Telakun || Onesongchai, Rajadamnern Stadium || Bangkok, Thailand || Decision || 5 || 3:00

|-  style="background:#fbb;"
| 2007-03-08 || Loss ||align=left| Captainken Narupai || Onesongchai, Rajadamnern Stadium || Bangkok, Thailand || TKO || 1 ||

|-  style="background:#cfc;"
| 2007-02-14 || Win ||align=left| Denkiri Sor Sommai ||  Sor.Sommai, Rajadamnern Stadium || Bangkok, Thailand || Decision || 5 || 3:00

|-  style="background:#fbb;"
| 2006-01-25 || Loss ||align=left| Saenchernglek Jirakriangkrai || Daorungchujaroen, Rajadamnern Stadium || Bangkok, Thailand || Decision || 5 || 3:00

|-  style="background:#fbb;"
| 2005-12-19 || Loss ||align=left| Saenchernglek Jirakriangkrai || Daorungchujaroen, Rajadamnern Stadium || Bangkok, Thailand || Decision || 5 || 3:00

|-  style="background:#cfc;"
| 2005-11-16 || Win ||align=left| Kairung Sor Chaijarean ||  Onesongchai, Rajadamnern Stadium || Bangkok, Thailand || Decision || 5 || 3:00

|-  style="background:#cfc;"
| 2005-09-15 || Win ||align=left| Dennaklang Sor.Weerapan ||  Sor.Wanchard, Rajadamnern Stadium || Bangkok, Thailand || Decision || 5 || 3:00

|-  style="background:#fbb;"
| 2005-08-10 || Loss ||align=left| Pokaew Sitchafuang || Wanmuaythai, Rajadamnern Stadium || Bangkok, Thailand || Decision || 5 || 3:00

|-  style="background:#fbb;"
| 2005-06-17 || Loss ||align=left| Chalermdet Sor Tawarung || Wanboonya, Lumpinee Stadium || Bangkok, Thailand || Decision || 5 || 3:00

|-  style="background:#fbb;"
| 2005-05-06 || Loss ||align=left| Chalermdet Sor Tawarung || Phetyindee + Kor.Sapaotong, Lumpinee Stadium || Bangkok, Thailand || Decision || 5 || 3:00

|-  style="background:#cfc;"
| 2005-03-18 || Win ||align=left| Traijak Sitjomtrai || Phetyindee + Kor.Sapaotong, Lumpinee Stadium || Bangkok, Thailand || Decision || 5 || 3:00 
|-
! style=background:white colspan=9 | 

|-  style="background:#cfc;"
| 2005-02-01 || Win ||align=left| Sam-A Gaiyanghadao || Fairtex, Lumpinee Stadium || Bangkok, Thailand || Decision || 5 || 3:00

|-  style="background:#c5d2ea;"
| 2005-01-04 || Draw||align=left| Kangwanlek Petchyindee || Petchyindee, Lumpinee Stadium || Bangkok, Thailand || Decision || 5 || 3:00

|-  style="background:#cfc;"
| 2004-12-07 || Win ||align=left|  Kingsang Manoprovitgym || Lumpinee Stadium Birthday Show || Bangkok, Thailand || Decision || 5 || 3:00

|-  style="background:#fbb;"
| 2004-11-02|| Loss ||align=left| Visanlek Sor.Thosaphon || Lumpinee Stadium ||Bangkok, Thailand || Decision  || 5 || 3:00

|-  style="background:#fbb;"
| 2004-09-14 || Loss ||align=left| Petch Por Burapha || Lumpinee Stadium || Bangkok, Thailand || Decision || 5 || 3:00

|-  style="background:#cfc;"
| 2004-08-10 || Win ||align=left| Romrun A.Benjamard || Petchyindee, Lumpinee Stadium || Bangkok, Thailand || Decision || 5 || 3:00

|-  style="background:#cfc;"
| 2004-07-09 || Win ||align=left| Kompayak Fairtex || Petchpiya, Lumpinee Stadium || Bangkok, Thailand || Decision || 5 || 3:00

|-  style="background:#c5d2ea;"
| 2004-05-18 || Draw||align=left| Duangsompong P.Khumpai || Petchpiya, Lumpinee Stadium || Bangkok, Thailand || Decision || 5 || 3:00

|-  style="background:#cfc;"
| 2004-04-06 || Win ||align=left| Siamchai Tor.Chalermchai || Paianan, Lumpinee Stadium || Bangkok, Thailand || Decision || 5 || 3:00

|-  style="background:#cfc;"
| 2004-02-14 || Win ||align=left| J.J Kor Charnsin || Lumpinee Krikrai, Lumpinee Stadium || Bangkok, Thailand || Decision || 5 || 3:00

|-  style="background:#fbb;"
| 2004-01-03 || Loss ||align=left| Wutichai Sor.Yupinda || Lumpinee Krikrai, Lumpinee Stadium || Bangkok, Thailand || Decision || 5 || 3:00

|-  style="background:#fbb;"
| 2003-12-03 || Loss ||align=left| Kayasit Chuwattana || Jarumuang, Rajadamnern Stadium || Bangkok, Thailand || Decision || 5 || 3:00

|-  style="background:#fbb;"
| 2003-11-11 || Loss ||align=left| Burapa Keatnapachai || Paianun, Lumpinee Stadium || Bangkok, Thailand || Decision || 5 || 3:00

|-  style="background:#fbb;"
| 2003-10-08 || Loss ||align=left| Sakmongkol Lukprabat || Daorungprabat, Rajadamnern Stadium || Bangkok, Thailand || Decision || 5 || 3:00

|-  style="background:#cfc;"
| 2003-09-11 || Win ||align=left| Samrandej Sor Danchai || Daorungchujaroen, Rajadamnern Stadium || Bangkok, Thailand || Decision || 5 || 3:00

|-  style="background:#fbb;"
| 2003-08-05 || Loss ||align=left| Hemaraj Chaoraioi || Paianun, Lumpinee Stadium || Bangkok, Thailand || Decision || 5 || 3:00

|-  style="background:#cfc;"
| 2003-06-28 || Win ||align=left| Prasatphet Sor.Rojpattanasuk || Lumpinee Champion Krikkrai, Lumpinee Stadium || Bangkok, Thailand || Decision || 5 || 3:00

|-  style="background:#cfc;"
| 2002-08-30 || Win ||align=left| Solex Chor.Rama 6 || Phetpanomrung, Lumpinee Stadium || Bangkok, Thailand || Decision || 5 || 3:00

|-  style="background:#cfc;"
|  || Win ||align=left| Olaydong Sitsamerchai || Lumpinee Stadium || Bangkok, Thailand || Decision || 5 || 3:00

|-  style="background:#cfc;"
|  || Win ||align=left| Sripelnoi Sor.Srisompong || Lumpinee Stadium || Bangkok, Thailand || Decision || 5 || 3:00

|-  style="background:#cfc;"
|  || Win ||align=left| Phuchoeng Tor.Rattanakiat || Lumpinee Stadium || Bangkok, Thailand || Decision || 5 || 3:00

|-  style="background:#cfc;"
|  || Win ||align=left| Detduanglek Por.Pongsawang || Lumpinee Stadium || Bangkok, Thailand || Decision || 5 || 3:00

|-
| colspan=9 | Legend:

References

Pettawee Sor Kittichai
Living people
1987 births
Pettawee Sor Kittichai